Udval is a Mongolian female name that means Aquilegia. Notable people with the name include:

Natsagiin Udval (born 1954), Mongolian politician
Sonomyn Udval (1921–1991) Mongolian politician and writer 
Tsogkhuu Udval (born 1994), Mongolian ju-jitsu practitioner

Feminine given names